José Díaz (born 2 December 1959) is a Panamanian weightlifter. He competed at the 1984 Summer Olympics and the 1988 Summer Olympics.

References

External links
 

1959 births
Living people
Panamanian male weightlifters
Olympic weightlifters of Panama
Weightlifters at the 1984 Summer Olympics
Weightlifters at the 1988 Summer Olympics
Place of birth missing (living people)
Pan American Games medalists in weightlifting
Pan American Games silver medalists for Panama
Central American and Caribbean Games medalists in weightlifting
Weightlifters at the 1979 Pan American Games
20th-century Panamanian people
21st-century Panamanian people